Miguel Ángel Gutiérrez Aguilar (born 21 July 1978) is a Mexican politician from the National Action Party. From 2008 to 2009 he served as Deputy of the LX Legislature of the Mexican Congress representing Jalisco.

References

1978 births
Living people
Politicians from Jalisco
National Action Party (Mexico) politicians
21st-century Mexican politicians
Deputies of the LX Legislature of Mexico
Members of the Chamber of Deputies (Mexico) for Jalisco